Pescennina is a genus of spiders in the family Oonopidae. It was first described in 1903 by Simon. , it contains 18 species.

Species
Pescennina comprises the following species:
Pescennina arborea Platnick & Dupérré, 2011
Pescennina cupida (Keyserling, 1881)
Pescennina epularis Simon, 1903
Pescennina fusca Platnick & Dupérré, 2011
Pescennina gertschi Platnick & Dupérré, 2011
Pescennina grismadoi Platnick & Dupérré, 2011
Pescennina ibarrai Platnick & Dupérré, 2011
Pescennina iviei Platnick & Dupérré, 2011
Pescennina laselva Platnick & Dupérré, 2011
Pescennina loreto Platnick & Dupérré, 2011
Pescennina magdalena Platnick & Dupérré, 2011
Pescennina murphyorum Platnick & Dupérré, 2011
Pescennina orellana Platnick & Dupérré, 2011
Pescennina otti Platnick & Dupérré, 2011
Pescennina piura Platnick & Dupérré, 2011
Pescennina sasaima Platnick & Dupérré, 2011
Pescennina sumidero Platnick & Dupérré, 2011
Pescennina viquezi Platnick & Dupérré, 2011

References

Oonopidae
Araneomorphae genera
Spiders of Mexico
Spiders of Central America
Spiders of South America